George Kranz is a German dance music singer and percussionist. He is best known for his song "Trommeltanz", otherwise known as "Din Daa Daa". The song hit No. 1 on the Hot Dance Music/Club Play chart in 1984 and then returned to the chart in a new version in 1991, peaking at No. 8. "Din Daa Daa" (sometimes spelled "Din Da Da") is considered a classic dance music track and has been remixed, sampled and bootlegged many times, including in 1987's seminal "Pump Up the Volume" by MARRS, 1998's Praise Joint Remix by Kirk Franklin, 2005's "Shake" by the Ying Yang Twins, "Turn Around" by Flo Rida an Xbox 360 commercial and a Google Chrome commercial.

Discography

Albums
My Rhythm (1983), Pool
Magic Sticks (OST) (1986), Virgin
Move It (1989), SPV
Sticky Druisin (1995)
Very Best Of (1999), DFP-Music (BMG)

Singles
"Trommeltanz" (1983), Pool
"Bass Drum Ma Bass Drum" (1985), Pool
"Heya" (1987)
"Helmut Kohl ist tot" (1992)
"Din Daa Daa (91 Remix)" (1991), Cardiac
"Din Daa Daa (96 Remix)" (1996), DiN

Producer
The Fog – Metallic Lord (1999), DFP-Music (BMG)
Bunny Rugs – On Soul (2002), DFP-Music (H`art)

Filmography
Breakin' 2: Electric Boogaloo
Kabine 19
Die Vier aus der Zwischenzeit (First season)
Tocata

The Passenger – Welcome to Germany

Happy Birthday (Unschuldig schuldig)

See also
 List of number-one dance hits (United States)
 List of artists who reached number one on the US Dance chart

References
Official website

1956 births
German house musicians
German male musicians
Living people